The following lists events that happened during 1932 in the Union of Soviet Socialist Republics.

Incumbents
 General Secretary of the Communist Party of the Soviet Union – Joseph Stalin
 Chairman of the Central Executive Committee of the Congress of Soviets – Mikhail Kalinin
 Chairman of the Council of People's Commissars of the Soviet Union – Vyacheslav Molotov

Events
 Soviet famine of 1932–33

January
 21 January – The Soviet–Finnish Non-Aggression Pact is signed.

July
 25 July – The Soviet–Polish Non-Aggression Pact is signed.

August
 7 August – The Law of Spikelets is enacted.

September
 23 September – Ryutin Affair: Martemyan Ryutin and the others in the Union of Marxists-Leninists are arrested.

Births
 4 January – Roman Personov, scientist (died 2002)
 10 January – Iskra Babich, film director
 25 January – Nikolay Anikin, skier
 27 January
 Rimma Kazakova, poet
 Boris Shakhlin, Olympic gymnast
 22 February – Victor Cherkashin, KGB counter-intelligence officer
 3 May – Maria Itkina, Olympic sprinter (died 2020)
 15 May – Arkady Volsky, politician
 6 June – Tamara Novikova, female cyclist
 13 June – Boris Katalimov, Chess International Master
 2 August – Vladimir Struzhanov, swimmer
 20 August – Vasily Aksyonov, novelist
 18 September – Nikolay Rukavishnikov, cosmonaut

See also
 1932 in fine arts of the Soviet Union
 List of Soviet films of 1932

References

 
1930s in the Soviet Union
Years in the Soviet Union
Soviet Union
Soviet Union
Soviet Union